Open Road is the debut solo album by British singer-songwriter Gary Barlow. It was released by BMG and RCA Records on 26 May 1997.

Album information
Following the break-up of Take That, Barlow went straight into the recording studio and began recording a solo album. On 5 July 1996, the album's lead single, "Forever Love", was released, peaking at number one on the UK Singles Chart. A second single, "Love Won't Wait", was released in April 1997, also peaking at number one. On 26 May 1997, the album was subsequently released, peaking at number one on the UK Albums Chart on the week of release. The album was certified platinum. Following the album's release, a further two singles, "So Help Me Girl" and "Open Road" were released, which charted at 11 and 7 respectively with the third single becoming Barlow's first solo material to chart in America.

International success
Following the success of the album in the United Kingdom and the album charting in over 21 countries internationally, Barlow set about releasing the album in the United States, and signed a record deal with Arista. He soon decided to re-work the album for the American market, and began promotion by releasing a remixed version of "So Help Me Girl" as the lead single, complete with a brand new video, on 30 September 1997. The album was subsequently released on 13 January 1998, and on 17 February, one of the new tracks for the American issue, "Superhero", was released as the second single. Although it became widely known for its use as the Yankees main theme, it failed to achieve any commercial success.

Critical reception

The San Diego Vista gave the album a positive review stating that as a "singer and songwriter [Barlow] demonstrates his potential as a successful solo artist on Open Road. The album shows a diversity of musical styles, many acoustic-based tracks, a few haunting ballads and some scintillating up-tempo dance numbers." Rodel goes on to state that "on the title track, "Open Road," Gary's brilliant songwriting abilities are showcased in all its glory. A song that he wrote at the young age of 16, "Open Road" reveals Gary's journey through life [making it] perhaps the best song on Gary's debut album."

Track listing

European edition

US edition

Notes
 signifies an additional producer
 signifies a remixer
 signifies a co-producer

Personnel
Credits for Open Road adapted from AllMusic.

Gary Barlow – composer, piano, producer, vocals
Absolute – mixing, multi instruments, producer
Walter Afanasieff – bass, drums, keyboards, organ, producer, programming, synthesizer
Alex Black – assistant engineer
Greg Calbi – mastering
Andreas Carlsson – backing vocals
Jake Chessum – photography
Clive Davis – executive producer
Joey Diggs – backing vocals
Felipe Elgueta – engineer
David Foster – arranger, vocals, keyboards, producer
Nick Foster – keyboards, producer, programming, remixing
Simon Franglen – programming
Paul Gendler – guitar
David Gleeson – engineer, mixing
Nathaniel Goldberg – photography
Jeff Griffin – assistant engineer
Sandy Griffith – backing vocals
Mick Guzauski – mixing
Phillip Ingram	– backing vocals
Judy Kirschner – assistant engineer
Bob Kraushaar – mixing
Kristian Lawing – Producer
Stephen Lipson – producer
Richard Lowe – mixing
Milton Mcdonald – guitar
Madonna – composer
Manny Marroquin – engineer, mixing
Max Martin	– producer, backing vocals
Grant Mitchell – arranger, producer, programming
P. Dennis Mitchell – mixing
Heff Moraes – engineer
Joey Moskowitz – programming
Esbjörn Öhrwall – guitar
Dean Parks – guitar
Shep Pettibone – composer
Chris Porter – producer
Claytoven Richardson – backing vocals
Marnie Riley – mixing assistant
Mike Rose – keyboards, producer, programming, remixing
Marc Russo – guest artist, tenor saxophone
Mike Scott – assistant engineer
Dan Shea – keyboards, programming
Andy Spooner – composer
Christopher Stern – art direction
Ren Swan – engineer
Michael Thompson – guitar
Jeanie Tracy – backing vocals
Junior Vasquez – producer
Norman Watson – photography
Dave Way – mixing
Wil Wheaton – backing vocals
Simon Willis – producer
Tim Willis – engineer

Charts

Weekly charts

Year-end charts

Certifications and sales

References

1997 debut albums
Gary Barlow albums
Albums produced by Stephen Lipson
Albums produced by David Foster
Albums produced by Max Martin